Henry Laurence may refer to:

 Henry Laurence (martyr) (died 1555), English Protestant martyr
 Henry Laurence (academic), Oxford college head in the 16th-century

See also
Henry Laurens (1724–1792), American Founding Father